Caloptilia ostracodes is a moth of the family Gracillariidae. It is known from Tasmania, Australia.

The larvae feed on Nothofagus cunninghami. They probably mine the leaves of their host plant.

References

ostracodes
Moths of Australia
Moths described in 1917